Justin Donovan Richards (born 16 October 1980) is an English former footballer who played as a striker. He has a tally of around one goal every four games and has played mostly in the Conference and lower reaches of the English Football League. Something of a journeyman player, he has tended to play for teams in his local area around the Midlands and Southern England.

Richards started his career at West Bromwich Albion in 1997, and failed to establish himself at the club in four years. After two years with Bristol Rovers he switched to Stevenage Borough. In 2004, he signed with Woking, and after a highly successful two years was snapped up by Peterborough United. In 2007, he joined Kidderminster Harriers, where he stayed for two years before he signed with Cheltenham Town. In the summer of 2010 he was signed to Port Vale, before moving on to Burton Albion the following year, and to Oxford United and then Tamworth in 2013. He signed with Sutton Coldfield Town in July 2014 and Stourbridge in September 2015, before returning to Sutton Coldfield Town in December 2017. The following summer he joined Rushall Olympic via Hednesford Town. In addition to this he has enjoyed six loan spells at Colchester United, Stevenage Borough, Grays Athletic, Boston United and Oxford United.

Club career
Richards began his career at West Bromwich Albion, joining as an apprentice in July 1997 and turning professional in 1999. He made his Albion debut as a substitute against Ipswich Town in March 1999, and made one further substitute appearance the following season before moving on to Ian Holloway's Bristol Rovers for £75,000 in January 2001. A week after signing him Holloway left the club. Richards joined Colchester United on loan on 22 October 2002. He spent six weeks at Layer Road, making three substitute appearances for Steve Whitton's "U's". In three seasons with the "Pirates" he started just three games and could do little to prevent the club's relegation from the second to third tier in 2000–01. At the end of 2002 he joined non-league Stevenage Borough on loan, scoring six goals in thirteen games, including a hat-trick against Farnborough Town.

Richards signed a permanent deal with Borough in March 2003. His high-scoring loan spell was not matched by a ratio of three goals in thirty games during his year-long injury-affected spell as a full-time Stevenage player. In May 2004 he moved on to Woking. His first season at the club was a moderate success with fourteen goals. During the 2005–06 season Richards was the second top scorer in the Conference with 22 goals in all competitions, a goalscoring record that attracted the attention of League Two club Peterborough United.

Richards moved to Peterborough in June 2006 on a free transfer, signing a two-year deal. This came despite interest from Burton Albion manager Nigel Clough. He scored just one goal for Peterborough before being loaned out to Conference club Grays Athletic in November 2006, as part of a deal which saw Peterborough sign Gray's striker Aaron McLean. He was recalled by the "Posh" the next month. Despite continued interest from Nigel Clough, in January 2007 Richards joined Boston United, then in League Two, on a one-month loan.

At the end of the 2006–07 season, unwanted at 'Boro by Darren Ferguson, Richards dropped back out of the Football League, signing for Kidderminster Harriers on a free transfer. He was considered a big signing for the club. He scored six goals in 22 appearances in his opening season with the "Harriers". In January 2008, he joined Oxford United on loan until the end of the season. He managed just one goal in fifteen appearances for the Oxfordshire club.

Richards returned to Kidderminster and decided to stay on at the club for the 2008–09 season. He enjoyed his second most prolific season in the Conference, hitting seventeen goals in all competitions. His shooting partner, and good friend, Matthew Barnes-Homer managed to top this tally with nineteen goals.

In June 2009, Richards signed a one-year contract with Cheltenham Town, making his second return to league football. He enjoyed a successful season in which he was the club's top scorer with 15 goals in 44 games. In summer 2010 Richards was offered a fresh contract at Cheltenham, but was also approached by League Two rivals Port Vale. In June 2010 Richards agreed terms with Port Vale.

He settled in quickly at the club, building a partnership with his namesake Marc Richards in the 2010–11 pre-season, which continued into the league campaign. He quickly endeared himself to "Valiants" fans, scoring a brace in their 3–1 win at Championship side Queens Park Rangers in the League Cup First Round. This was followed by a thirteen-game barren spell, which was ended by three goals in four games, including a strike that took the club into the Third Round of the FA Cup. The Richards duo's partnership was ended in January when Marc suffered a thigh injury; upon his recovery Justin was dropped to make way for loan striker Tom Pope. Richards scored his first hat-trick in the English Football League on 30 April, along with Louis Dodds, in a 7–2 win over Morecambe. In all he helped himself to fourteen goals in fifty appearances that season, whilst his strike partner and namesake hit twenty goals in 46 games.

In July 2011, Richards signed a two-year contract with Vale's nearby League Two rivals Burton Albion, after moving on a free transfer. Though the move came as a surprise to outside observers, Burton manager Paul Peschisolido said that "Justin is a player I admire and...I'm sure he'll bring us goals." Richards scored twice on his league debut, helping Burton earn a 2–2 draw at Torquay United on 6 August. After four games without a goal, he then went on a streak of six goals in five games, including a brace against Oxford United at the Kassam Stadium. Richards finished the 2011–12 campaign with 12 goals in 37 appearances.

Under the stewardship of Gary Rowett, Richards slipped behind Calvin Zola, Matt Paterson, and Billy Kee in a largely single-striker system in 2012–13. He returned to Chris Wilder's Oxford United on loan for a second time in January 2013; he was signed to provide cover for the suspended James Constable. He played three games for Oxford, and was released from his contract at the Pirelli Stadium by Rowett at the end of the month. He signed for Oxford on a deal until the end of the 2012–13 season on deadline day, 1 February 2013. However, after less than two weeks he was ruled out of action for the rest of the season after picking up a knee injury. He was one of 12 players released by manager Chris Wilder in May 2013.

In June 2013, Richards signed a contract with Tamworth to play for them in the Conference Premier for the forthcoming season; manager Dale Belford stated that securing his services was a "massive coup" for the "Lambs". He scored only one goal in 18 league appearances throughout the 2013–14 season, as the "Lambs" suffered relegation.

Neil Tooth, manager of Northern Premier League Division One South side Sutton Coldfield Town, signed Richards in July 2014. He finished as the "Royals" top-scorer in the 2014–15 season with 23 goals, helping the club to win promotion after beating Leek Town in the play-off final.

He moved on to Northern Premier League Premier Division rivals Stourbridge in September 2015. The club finished in sixth place in 2015–16, and qualified for the play-offs with a third-place finish in 2016–17 before losing 1–0 to Spennymoor Town in the play-off final. He rejoined Sutton Coldfield Town in December 2017. Town were relegated after they finished bottom of the Northern Premier League Premier Division at the end of the 2017–18 season. He went on to join Hednesford Town, but left the club after less than a month after it was confirmed they would not be placed in the Southern League Premier Division Central the following season. On 20 July 2018, he joined Rushall Olympic in the Southern League Premier Division Central. The "Pics" finished the 2018–19 season in eighth-place, with Richards scoring one goal in 12 games.

International career
His success at Woking saw him earn a call-up to the England C team in May 2006. He scored in his only game, a 1–1 draw with Wales in the Four Nations Tournament at Priory Lane. His career as a semi-international was quickly ended once he joined Football League club Peterborough United later that year.

Personal life
On 19 December 2010, Richards and four friends took part in a drunken brawl with another man during a night out in Leeds. The following year he pleaded guilty to affray, and was fined £2,000 and given a community order with 100 hours unpaid work. Two of his friends were given suspended prison sentences, whilst the other two were also fined and given unpaid work. Judge James Spencer QC accepted that the men behaved out of character and were ashamed of their behaviour.

In June 2011 he was studying to complete a degree in Professional Sports Writing and Broadcasting at Staffordshire University, alongside former teammates Gareth Owen, Adam Yates, and Ritchie Sutton.

Career statistics

Honours
Woking
Football League Trophy runner-up: 2005–06

Sutton Coldfield Town
Northern Premier League Division One South play-offs: 2014–15

References

1980 births
Living people
English footballers
England semi-pro international footballers
Association football forwards
Black British sportspeople
West Bromwich Albion F.C. players
Bristol Rovers F.C. players
Colchester United F.C. players
Stevenage F.C. players
Woking F.C. players
Peterborough United F.C. players
Grays Athletic F.C. players
Boston United F.C. players
Kidderminster Harriers F.C. players
Oxford United F.C. players
Cheltenham Town F.C. players
Port Vale F.C. players
Burton Albion F.C. players
Tamworth F.C. players
Sutton Coldfield Town F.C. players
Stourbridge F.C. players
Hednesford Town F.C. players
Rushall Olympic F.C. players
National League (English football) players
English Football League players
Northern Premier League players
Southern Football League players
Alumni of Staffordshire University